Keegan-Michael Key (born March 22, 1971) is an American actor, comedian, screenwriter, and producer. He co-created and co-starred alongside Jordan Peele in Comedy Central's sketch series Key & Peele (2012–2015) and co-starred in USA Network's Playing House (2014–2017). He spent six seasons as a cast member on Mad TV (2004–2009) and has made guest appearances on the U.S. version of Whose Line is it Anyway? on The CW. He also appeared alongside Peele in the first season of the FX series Fargo in 2014, and had a recurring role on Parks and Recreation from 2013 to 2015. He hosted the U.S. version of The Planet's Funniest Animals on Animal Planet (2005–2008), and hosted Game On! on CBS in 2020.

Key has had supporting roles in several films, including Horrible Bosses 2 in (2014), Pitch Perfect 2 (2015), Don't Think Twice (2016) and Dolemite Is My Name (2019). He has provided voice-work for The Lego Movie (2014), the subsequent films of the Hotel Transylvania franchise (2015–2022), Storks, The Angry Birds Movie (both 2016), The Star (2017), The Lion King remake and Toy Story 4 (both 2019), and Pinocchio remake (2022). Also in 2015, he appeared at the White House Correspondents' Dinner as the Key & Peele character Luther, President Barack Obama's anger translator. Key and Peele produced and starred in the 2016 action-comedy film Keanu. In 2017, Key made his Broadway debut in Steve Martin's comic play Meteor Shower. Key appeared in the musical film The Prom (2020) directed by Ryan Murphy on Netflix, and the musical comedy series Schmigadoon! (2021) on Apple TV+.

Early life
Key was born in Southfield, Michigan, on March 22, 1971, the son of an African-American father, Leroy McDuffie, and Carrie Herr, a woman of Polish and Flemish descent. He was adopted at a young age by a couple from Detroit, Michael Key and Patricia Walsh, who were both social workers. Like his birth parents, his adoptive parents were also a black man and a white woman. Through his biological father, Key had two half-brothers, one of whom was comic book writer Dwayne McDuffie. Key discovered the existence of his half-siblings only after they had both died.

Raised Catholic, Key attended the University of Detroit Mercy as an undergraduate, earning a Bachelor of Fine Arts degree in theater in 1993, followed by a Master of Fine Arts in theater at Pennsylvania State University in 1996. While at the University of Detroit Mercy, he was a brother of Phi Kappa Theta.

Career

Mad TV
In 2004, Key joined the cast of Mad TV midway into the ninth season. He and Jordan Peele were cast against each other, but both ended up being picked after demonstrating great comedic chemistry. Key played many characters on the show. One of his most famous characters is "Coach Hines", a high school sports coach who frequently disrupts and threatens students and faculty members. On the penultimate episode of Mad TV, Hines revealed that he is the long-lost heir to the Heinz Ketchup company and only became a Catholic school coach to help delinquent teenagers like Yamanashi (Bobby Lee). During seasons 9 and 10, Key appeared as "Dr. Funkenstein" in blaxploitation parodies, with Peele playing the monster. Key also portrayed various guests on Real **********ing Talk like the strong African Rollo Johnson and blind victim Stevie Wonder Washington. He often went "backstage" as Eugene Struthers, an ecstatic water-or-flower delivery man who accosts celebrities. There was also "Jovan Muskatelle", a shirtless man with a jheri curl and a shower cap who interrupts live news broadcasts by a reporter (always played by Ike Barinholtz), annoying him with rapid-fire accounts of events that have happened frequently exclaiming "It was crazy as hell!" Celebrities that Key impersonated on the show include Ludacris, Snoop Dogg, Roscoe Orman (as his character Gordon from Sesame Street), Matthew Lillard, Bill Cosby, Al Roker, Terrell Owens, Tyler Perry, Keith Richards, Eddie Murphy (as his character James "Thunder" Early from the movie Dreamgirls), Sherman Hemsley (as his character George Jefferson on The Jeffersons), Charles Barkley, Sendhil Ramamurthy (as Mohinder Suresh), Tyson Beckford, Seal (originally played by Peele until Peele left the show at the end of season 13), Sidney Poitier, Lionel Richie, Barack Obama, Kobe Bryant and Jack Haley (as the Tin Man from The Wizard of Oz). He also played female celebrities, including Phylicia Rashād, Robin Antin, and Eva Longoria (as Gabrielle Solis on a Desperate Housewives parody).

Key & Peele
Key and his Mad TV castmate Jordan Peele starred in their own Comedy Central sketch series Key & Peele, which began airing on January 31, 2012 and ran for five seasons until September 9, 2015. 

Key was introduced by President Barack Obama at the 2015 White House Correspondents' Dinner as Luther, Obama's Anger Translator, one of Key's characters from Key & Peele.

Friends from College
Key played the most prominent male character, Ethan Turner, on the Netflix ensemble comedy Friends from College, about a group of Harvard University graduates and friends now in their late 30s living in New York City. He plays an award-winning fiction writer who is being encouraged to start writing for young adult fiction audiences.

Other work

Key was one of the founders of Hamtramck, Michigan,'s Planet Ant Theatre, and was a member of the Second City Detroit's mainstage cast before joining the Second City e.t.c. theater in Chicago. Key co-founded the Detroit Creativity Project along with Beth Hagenlocker, Marc Evan Jackson, Margaret Edwartowski, and Larry Joe Campbell. The Detroit Creativity Project teaches students in Detroit improvisation as a way to improve their communication skills. Key performed with The 313, an improv group formed with other members of Second City Hollywood that appears around the country. The 313 is made up primarily of former Detroit residents and is named for Detroit's area code.

He made a cameo in "Weird Al" Yankovic's video "White & Nerdy" with Peele. Key also hosted Animal Planet's The Planet's Funniest Animals. In 2009, Key hosted GSN's "Big Saturday Night", and has co-starred in Gary Unmarried on CBS. Key was a panelist on the NPR comedy quiz show Wait Wait, Don't Tell Me... on March 27 and July 24, 2010. Key has been in several episodes of Reno 911! as the "Hypothetical Criminal".

Key and Peele were featured on the cover and in a series of full-page comic photos illustrating The New York Times Magazine article "Is Giving the Secret to Getting Ahead?" on March 31, 2013. A live-action video version was also featured on the Times''' website. Key co-stars in the horror-comedy Hell Baby. Key is one of the rotating "fourth chair" performers in the 2013 revival of Whose Line Is It Anyway?.

In addition to Key & Peele, he also co-starred in the USA Network comedy series Playing House, which began airing in April 2014.

Together with Peele, Key played an FBI agent in a recurring role in the 2014 FX crime drama Fargo.

Key and Peele starred in an episode of Epic Rap Battles of History, with Key playing Mahatma Gandhi and Peele playing Martin Luther King Jr. The pair returned to Epic Rap Battles of History with the "Muhammad Ali versus Michael Jordan" battle, with Key portraying Jordan.

Key was involved in audio episodes for the marketing campaign, "Hunt the Truth" on the website for the video game Halo 5: Guardians, voicing a fictional journalist and war photographer named Benjamin Giraud, who investigates the Master Chief's background.

Key has had roles in numerous films, including 2014's Horrible Bosses 2, Let's Be Cops and the animated The Lego Movie, as well as Pitch Perfect 2 and Tomorrowland in 2015. Key and Peele are currently working with Judd Apatow on a feature-length film for Universal Pictures.

Key is one of several hosts of the podcast Historically Black by American Public Media and The Washington Post.

Key voices the character Murray in Hotel Transylvania 2, Hotel Transylvania 3: Summer Vacation and Hotel Transylvania: Transformania. The character was originally voiced by rapper CeeLo Green in the first movie.

In the summer of 2017 Key returned to the theatre after what he characterized as a "19-year detour into sketch comedy" for a production of Hamlet at New York's Public Theater, playing Horatio opposite Oscar Isaac in the title role. Key, who is a Shakespearean-trained actor, fulfilled his lifelong dream to play Horatio and received rave reviews for his performance. The Hollywood Reporter's David Rooney noted that Key's comedic skills were on full display, "...but his ease with the verse and stirring sensitivity [was] a revelation."

Key voice acted in The Star, the animated film based on the Nativity of Jesus. He later went on to voice Ducky in Toy Story 4 and Kamari in The Lion King. Key voiced "Honest John" Worthington Foulfellow in the live-action film adaptation of Disney's Pinocchio and Toad in The Super Mario Bros. Movie from Illumination.

In 2017, Key made his Broadway debut in Steve Martin's comedy Meteor Shower. His hosting stint on Saturday Night Live on May 15, 2021 marked the first time a MADtv cast member has hosted SNL.

Key currently hosts popular science show Brain Games'' on National Geographic, which was renewed for a ninth season, his second, on January 17, 2020.

On May 14, 2020, he hosted an online event by the Jazz Foundation of America to support its emergency fund for COVID-19.

Personal life
Key was married to actress and dialect coach Cynthia Blaise from 1998 until 2017. They were legally separated in November 2015, with Key filing for divorce the following month. He married producer and director Elisa Pugliese in New York City on June 8, 2018.

Key is a Christian and has practiced Buddhism, Catholicism, and Evangelicalism in the past. Being biracial has been a source of comedic material for Key, who told Terry Gross in an interview for NPR, "I think the reason Jordan and I became actors is because we did a fair amount of code-switching growing up and still do." Key is a keen soccer fan and an avid supporter of English Premier League club Liverpool.

Philanthropy
Key has worked with the Young Storytellers Foundation as an actor for their annual fundraiser alongside Max Greenfield, Jack Black and Judy Greer.

Filmography

Film

Television

Stage

Video games

Music videos

Podcasts

Awards and nominations

References

External links

 

 

1971 births
Living people
20th-century American comedians
20th-century American male actors
21st-century American comedians
21st-century American male actors
African-American Christians
African-American male actors
African-American male comedians
African American adoptees
American adoptees
American Christians
American impressionists (entertainers)
American male comedians
American male film actors
American male screenwriters
American male stage actors
American male television actors
American male voice actors
American sketch comedians
Male actors from Detroit
Peabody Award winners
Penn State College of Arts and Architecture alumni
People from Southfield, Michigan
Primetime Emmy Award winners
Screenwriters from Michigan
Television producers from Michigan
University of Detroit Mercy alumni